The 1945–46 Yorkshire Cup was the thirty-eighth occasion on which the competition had been held.

In this, the  first peacetime Cup final for five years, there is a new name on the  trophy. Bradford Northern who previously won the trophy in 1940–41, 1941–42 and 1943–44, can now lay claim to a genuine trophy (The  wartime competitions were not counted officially in the records)
Bradford Northern won the trophy by beating Wakefield Trinity by the score of 5-2

The match was played at Thrum Hall, Halifax, now in West Yorkshire. The attendance was 24,252 and receipts were £1,934

Background 

The Second World War was now over, and things were beginning to return to normal, although still a long way to go. Hull Kingston Rovers and Bramley re-joined the competition and the four Lancashire clubs returned to their own competition. This season there were no junior/amateur clubs taking part, and these changes resulted in the number of entrants falling by two, and leaving a total number of entries at fifteen.

This in turn resulted in one bye in the first round.

The  competition reverted to original formula of a knock-out tournament, with the  exception of the  first round which was still played on a two-legged home and away basis.

Competition and results

Round 1 – first leg 
Involved  7 matches (with one bye) and 15 clubs

All first round ties are played on a two-legged home and away basis

Round 1 – second leg  
Involved  7 matches (with one bye) and 15 clubs

All first round ties are played on a two-legged home and away basis

Round 2 - quarterfinals 
Involved 4 matches and 8 clubs

All second round ties are played on a two-legged home and away basis

Round 3 – semifinals  
Involved 2 matches and 4 clubs

Both semi-final ties are played on a two-legged home and away basis

Final

Teams and scorers 

Scoring - Try = three (3) points - Goal = two (2) points - Drop goal = two (2) points

The road to success 
All the ties in the  first round were played on a two leg (home and away) basis.

For the  first round ties, the first club named in each of the ties played the first leg at home.

For the  first round ties, the scores shown are the aggregate score over the two legs.

Notes and comments 
1 * The date is given by RUGBYLEAGUEprojec  as Tuesday 16 October, but by the official Hull F.C. archives as Wednesday 17 Oct

2 * Thrum Hall was the home ground of Halifax with a final capacity of 9,832 (The attendance record of 29,153 was set on 21 March 1959 for a third round Challenge Cup tie v  Wigan). The club finally moved out in 1998 to take part ownership and ground-share with Halifax Town FC at The Shay Stadium.

General information for those unfamiliar 
The Rugby League Yorkshire Cup competition was a knock-out competition between (mainly professional) rugby league clubs from  the  county of Yorkshire. The actual area was at times increased to encompass other teams from  outside the  county such as Newcastle, Mansfield, Coventry, and even London (in the form of Acton & Willesden.

The Rugby League season always (until the onset of "Summer Rugby" in 1996) ran from around August-time through to around May-time and this competition always took place early in the season, in the Autumn, with the final taking place in (or just before) December (The only exception to this was when disruption of the fixture list was caused during, and immediately after, the two World Wars)

See also 
1945–46 Northern Rugby Football League season
Rugby league county cups

References

External links
Saints Heritage Society
1896–97 Northern Rugby Football Union season at wigan.rlfans.com
Hull&Proud Fixtures & Results 1896/1897
Widnes Vikings - One team, one passion Season In Review - 1896-97
The Northern Union at warringtonwolves.org

1945 in English rugby league
RFL Yorkshire Cup